France competed at the 2002 Winter Olympics in Salt Lake City, Utah.

Medalists

Alpine skiing

Men

Men's combined

Women

Biathlon

Men

Men's 4 × 7.5 km relay

Women

Women's 4 × 7.5 km relay

 1 A penalty loop of 150 metres had to be skied per missed target. 
 2 Starting delay based on 10 km sprint results. 
 3 One minute added per missed target. 
 4 Starting delay based on 7.5 km sprint results.

Bobsleigh

Men

Cross-country skiing

Men
Pursuit

 1 Starting delay based on 10 km C. results. 
 C = Classical style, F = Freestyle

4 × 10 km relay

Women
Pursuit

 2 Starting delay based on 5 km C. results. 
 C = Classical style, F = Freestyle

Curling

Men's competition

Group stage
Top four teams advanced to semi-finals.

|}

Contestants

Figure skating

Men

Women

Ice Dancing

Freestyle skiing

Men

Women

Ice hockey

Men's tournament

Preliminary round - Group B
Top team (shaded) advanced to the first round.

Consolation round
13th place match

Team roster
Cristobal Huet
Fabrice Lhenry
Patrick Rolland
Allan Carriou
Vincent Bachet
Karl Dewolf
Jean-François Bonnard
Denis Perez
Benoit Pourtanel
Baptiste Amar
Benoit Bachelet
Stéphane Barin
Arnaud Briand
Maurice Rozenthal
Laurent Meunier
Francis Rozenthal
Philippe Bozon
Yorick Treille
Guillaume Besse
Jonathan Zwikel
Anthony Mortas
Richard Aimonetto
Laurent Gras
Head coach: Heikki Leime

Luge

Men

Women

Nordic combined 

Men's sprint

Events:
 large hill ski jumping
 7.5 km cross-country skiing 

Men's individual

Events:
 normal hill ski jumping
 15 km cross-country skiing 

Men's Team

Four participants per team.

Events:
 normal hill ski jumping
 5 km cross-country skiing

Short track speed skating

Men

Women

Skeleton

Men

Ski jumping 

Men's team large hill

 1 Four teams members performed two jumps each.

Snowboarding

Men's parallel giant slalom

Men's halfpipe

Women's parallel giant slalom

Women's halfpipe

Speed skating

Men

References
 Olympic Winter Games 2002, full results by sports-reference.com

Nations at the 2002 Winter Olympics
2002
Winter Olympics